During the 2002–03 English football season, Gillingham F.C. competed in the Football League First Division.

Season summary
Gillingham topped the table after three matches, but that would be as good as it got for the Kent side. They were within a shout of the playoffs as late as March, but a run of three wins from their last thirteen (two of those wins came in the final three games) saw their slim promotion hopes quashed, although the final 11th place was Gillingham's highest ever in the Football League.

In the FA Cup, Gillingham earned a 1–1 home draw against Premiers League Leeds United in the fourth round, before losing 2–1 in the replay at Elland Road. This would be the scoreline that saw Gillingham knocked out of the League Cup too, against Chelsea at Stamford Bridge.

Kit
Gillingham continued to manufacture their team kits under their own brand, while French ferry company SeaFrance remained kit sponsors. The kit was essentially the same as that worn the previous season, except that the collar had been changed, to a v-neck shape with a red band.

Final league table

 Pld = Matches ; W = Matches won; D = Matches drawn; L = Matches lost; F = Goals for; A = Goals against; GD = Goal difference; Pts = Points
 NB: In the Football League goals scored (F) takes precedence over goal difference (GD).

Results
Gillingham's score comes first

Legend

Football League First Division

FA Cup

League Cup

Squad
Squad at end of season

Left club during season

Transfers

In
 Leon Johnson - Southend United, free, 2002
 Rod Wallace - Bolton Wanderers, free, June 2002
 Mamady Sidibe - Swansea City, free, 7 August 2002

References

Gillingham F.C. seasons
Gillingham